Kangerlussuaq Icefjord (old spelling: Kangerdlugssuaq) is a fjord in Avannaata municipality in northwestern Greenland.

Geography 

The fjord mouth is located in the northernmost part of Tasiusaq Bay, between Tuttorqortooq Island in the southwest and Mernoq Island in the north.

Qaaneq Fjord 
The innermost portion of the fjord bears a different name: Qaaneq (old spelling: Qâneq). It is an inner extension of Kangerlussuaq Icefjord, with the flow from one to the other disrupted by the Kakiffait Sermiat glacier tongue. If the length of both fjords were to be combined, the total length of Kangerlussuaq Icefjord would reach .

See also
List of fjords of Greenland

References

External links
1:1,000,000 scale Operational Navigation Chart, Sheet B-8

Tasiusaq Bay
Fjords of the Upernavik Archipelago